Mount Bridgland is a  mountain located in the Victoria Cross Ranges of Jasper National Park in Alberta, Canada. It was named by Frank Sissons in 1923 after Morrison P. Bridgland (1878-1948), a Dominion Land Surveyor who named many peaks in Jasper Park and the Canadian Rockies.

Climate

Based on the Köppen climate classification, Mount Bridgland is located in a subarctic climate zone with cold, snowy winters, and mild summers. Precipitation runoff from the mountain drains into tributaries of the Miette River.

Geology

The mountain is composed of sedimentary rock laid down during the Precambrian to Jurassic periods and pushed east and over the top of younger rock during the Laramide orogeny.

See also

 List of mountains in the Canadian Rockies
 Geography of Alberta

References

Bridgland
Bridgland
Bridgland